At least two groups of people in Africa are described as the Yombe people.  They reside primarily in Zambia,   Republic of the Congo,  the Democratic Republic of the Congo and Angola.  Adept at crafts and art, the men are involved in weaving, carving, and smelting, and the women make clay pots. Popular figures include the Nkisi nkonde and  female phemba statues.

Distribution
This group refers to people among the tumbuka of Zambia. Yombe is one of the six foreign groups who invaded Tumbuka people after 1760. Another group, also referred to as the Yombe people, live in the south-western part of the Republic of the Congo, with others living in the Democratic Republic of the Congo and Angola. This group refers to people among the Kongo.

Economic practices
The Yombe are primarily involved in agricultural production, growing crops such as plantains, maize, beans,  manioc, peanuts, and yams. Though they grow primarily for food supply, they also sell their crops at the market. Goats, pigs and chickens are raised and fishing is practised on the Congo River. Adept at crafts and art, the men are involved in weaving, carving, and smelting, and the women make clay pots.

Cultural and religious practices

The artistry of Yombe figurines and statues is well known, usually objects of prestige,  kings seated on the throne, or female phemba (maternity) statues.  Nkisi nkonde figurines, masks and drums are also made for ceremonies. Their funerary figures are renowned for their realistic depictions.

The supreme deity of the Yombe is Ngoma Bunzi, who hails from an unreachable realm called Yulu. He is contacted via Nzambi a Tsi (earth spirits) and Simbi (river spirits). The Yombe people build shrines as memorials to prominent ancestors, such as village chiefs who has special powers. The Yombe people of northern Zambia believe that people have three different identities: biological, social, and spiritual. Their social standing affects the type of funeral which might be given.

References

External links

Ethnic groups in Zambia
Ethnic groups in the Republic of the Congo
Ethnic groups in the Democratic Republic of the Congo
Ethnic groups in Angola